The Selemdzha mine is a large mine located in the Amur Oblast. Selemdzha represents one of the largest phosphates reserve in Russia having estimated reserves of 500 million tonnes of ore grading 35% P2O5.

See also 
 List of mines in Russia

References 

Phosphate mines in Russia